Stanisław Majerczak is a former Polish slalom canoeist who competed in the 1970s. He won two silver medals in the K-1 team event at the ICF Canoe Slalom World Championships, earning them in 1973 and 1975.

References

Polish male canoeists
Living people
Year of birth missing (living people)
Place of birth missing (living people)
Medalists at the ICF Canoe Slalom World Championships